Dural is a surname. Notable people with the surname include:

Travin Dural (born 1993), American football player
Stanley Joseph Dural (1947–2016), American accordionist

See also
Dubal (surname)
Duval